Detective Chief Inspector James Keats is a fictional character in BBC One's science fiction/police procedural drama, Ashes to Ashes. The character is portrayed by actor Daniel Mays.

Biography
DCI James "Jim" Keats claimed to have been sent from the Discipline and Complaints department of Scotland Yard to assess the Fenchurch East division of the London Metropolitan Police (led by DCI Gene Hunt) as part of Operation Countryman. In reality, Keats was a malevolent spirit, if not Satan, who aimed to destroy the division and bring its members to his department.

References

External links
 Keats' letters to Superintendent Callahan regarding Fenchurch East

Fictional British police detectives
Fictional demons and devils
Ashes to Ashes (TV series) characters